Haloimpatiens massiliensis is a Gram-positive, anaerobic and rod-shaped bacterium from the genus of Haloimpatiens which has been isolated from the gut of an infant from Marseille.

References

Clostridiaceae
Bacteria described in 2020
Bacillota